The Front for Democracy and Human Rights was an alliance founded by Mostafa Moin in 2005, as the main theme for his presidential campaign during 2005 election. Moin referred the alliance's aim as "to defend the rights of all Iran’s religious and ethnic groups, the youth, academicians, women and political opposition groups whose rights are often neglected."

The Council of Nationalist-Religious Activists of Iran and Freedom Movement of Iran joined the alliance, along with the reformers.

Hussein-Ali Montazeri backed the front.

References

2005 establishments in Iran
Defunct political party alliances in Iran
Reform in Iran
Freedom Movement of Iran